Florida hosts many types of fauna. From coral reefs of the Florida Keys to the cypress swamps of the Panhandle, the state's diverse habitats are home to a variety of wildlife. Florida is among the top five states in terms of endemic species. There are over 700 terrestrial animals, 200 freshwater fish species, 1,000 marine fish and thousands of terrestrial insects and other invertebrates that inhabit the state. Florida's peninsular geography spans from subtropical to tropical zones, which, combined with its distinctive geology and climate, contribute to habitat diversity and an array of species. The native wildlife that exists in the state are of temperate and tropical origin. 

Florida once had a large number of extant species that formerly occupied the state in prehistoric and historic times, but became locally extinct; such as the California condor, Northern short-tailed shrew, magpie, indigo snake, northern leopard frog, porcupine, great black hawk, gray whale, red wolf, elk, hog-nosed skunk, gray wolf, underwood's bonneted bat, white-tailed jackrabbit, band-tailed pigeon, jaguar, grass wren, margay, jabiru, ocelot, ghost-faced bat, collared peccary, great-tailed grackle, ringed kingfisher, common opossum, grey-breasted crake, Northern jacana, yellow-headed caracara, ruffed grouse, Southern lapwing and greater prairie chicken.

Mammals

Aquatic mammal species are represented by the bottlenose dolphin, short-finned pilot whale, North Atlantic right whale and West Indian manatee. Terrestrial species; the Florida panther, northern river otter, mink, eastern cottontail rabbit, marsh rabbit, raccoon, striped skunk, squirrel, white-tailed deer, bobcat, red fox, gray fox, coyote, Florida black wolf, beaver, Florida black bear, nine-banded armadillo, and Virginia opossum. The only known calving area for the northern right whale is off the coasts of Florida and Georgia.

The native bear population has risen from a historic low of 300 in the 1970s, to 3,000 in 2011. In Paynes Prairie Preserve State Park, The plains bison were reintroduced to the park from the Wichita Mountains Wildlife Refuge in 1975, as part of the park service goal of restoring Florida's natural resources to pre-European settler conditions; they roamed this area until the late 18th century. When bison sightings occur, they usually appear along the Cone's Dike trail. The herd was reduced from thirty-five to seven individuals in the mid-1980s after an outbreak of Brucellosis. In the late 1990s, the herd was again reduced after inbreeding concerns. The buffalo herd reached a peak of 70 animals in 2011. The park began culling excessive animals in 2012, allowing a target population of about 8 to 10 bison to be free to roam the Florida prairie.

Birds
 
Bird species include the Peregrine falcon, bald eagle, American flamingo, crested caracara, snail kite, osprey, white and brown pelicans, sea gulls, whooping and sandhill cranes, roseate spoonbill, American white ibis, Florida scrub jay (state endemic), and others. One subspecies of wild turkey, Meleagris gallopavo, namely subspecies osceola, is found only in Florida. The state is a wintering location for many species of eastern North American birds.

As a result of climate change, there have been small numbers of several new species normally native to cooler areas to the north: snowy owls, snow buntings, harlequin ducks, and razorbills. These have been seen in the northern part of the state.

The American flamingo was also found in South Florida, which was likely the northernmost extent of its distribution.
The study also indicated that these flamingos may be increasing in population and reclaiming their lost land. Large flocks of flamingos are still known to visit Florida from time to time, most notably in 2014, when a very large flock of over 147 flamingos temporarily stayed at Stormwater Treatment Area 2, on Lake Okeechobee, with a few returning the following year. From a distance, untrained eyes can also confuse it with the roseate spoonbill.

Reptiles
Indigenous reptiles include Eastern diamondback, pygmy rattlesnakes, gopher tortoise, green and leatherback sea turtles, and eastern indigo snake and fence lizards. In 2012, there were about one million American alligators and 1,500 crocodiles. The highest species of freshwater turtles (consisting of 13 species) in Florida occur in the Escambia River basin. Other basins, particularly in the panhandle and northern central of the state contain 12 species. North Florida has the third richest turtle fauna in the world. The state's native species has 31 turtles, 15 lizards, 2 crocodilians, and 40 snakes.

Amphibians
Florida is home to forty nine native species of amphibians, including 29 frogs, 19 salamanders and 4 that are of special concern. Examples of amphibians inhabiting Florida include mole salamander, American bullfrog, lesser siren, eastern newt, gopher frog, three-lined salamander and green frog. Specimens belonging to the reticulated siren have been found in the northern part of the state, even though the species was first described in 2018.

Fish
About 250 different species of fish (including 73 non-native species) inhabit Florida. There are more than 1,000 species of fish occurring in the state's inshore waters.

Invertebrates
Notable examples of insect species include Carpenter ants, termites, American cockroach, the Miami blue butterfly, and the grizzled mantis. There are 29 species or subspecies of Bees that are endemic within the state of Florida and are not believed to occur anywhere else in the world, including 21 types of pollinators and 8 parasitic species of Bees.

Nonnative wildlife

Florida also has more than 500 nonnative animal species and 1,000 nonnative insects found throughout the state. Some exotic species living in Florida include the Burmese python, green iguana, veiled chameleon, Argentine black and white tegu, peacock bass, mayan cichlid, lionfish, Africanized bee, White-nosed coati, rhesus macaque, vervet monkey, Cuban tree frog, cane toad, Indian peafowl, monk parakeet, tui parakeet, and many more. Some of these nonnative species do not pose a threat to any native species, but some do threaten the native species of Florida by living in the state and eating them.

Six of Red deer were released on Buck Island Breeding Ranch in Highlands County in 1967 or 1968. The herd increased to less than 30 animals. In 1993, 10 animals were seen in the area, and small numbers have been sighted subsequently in the same area.

Since their accidental importation from South America into North America in the 1930s, the red imported fire ant population has increased its territorial range to include most of the southern United States, including Florida. They are more aggressive than most native ant species and have a painful sting.

A number of non-native snakes and lizards have been released in the wild. In 2010, the state created a hunting season for Burmese and Indian pythons, African rock pythons, green anacondas, yellow anacondas, common boas, and Nile monitor lizards. Green iguanas have also established a firm population in the southern part of the state. Due to a combination of events, the green iguana is considered an invasive species in South Florida and is found along the east coast as well as the Gulf Coast of Florida from Key West to Pinellas County.

There are about 500,000 feral pigs in Florida.

Lists
Amphibians
Birds
in Biscayne National Park
in Dry Tortugas National Park
in Everglades National Park
Fish
Mammals
Reptiles
Snakes
Burmese pythons

There are a number of invasive species in the state:
Invasive species
in the Everglades
Fish

References

External links
Native flora and fauna of Florida - University of Florida

Fauna of the Southeastern United States
 
Natural history of Florida